Mateusz Tomasz Hewelt (born 23 September 1996) is a Polish footballer who plays as a goalkeeper for EFL League Two club Tranmere Rovers.

Career
At the age of 5, Hewelt moved to the Republic of Ireland, where he was scouted by English Premier League side Everton, who eventually signed him.

In 2019, Hewelt signed for Miedź Legnica in the Polish second division.

On 3 October 2020, he scored an equaliser in stoppage time of a 2–2 draw against Chrobry Głogów.

He signed for Northern Premier League side Bamber Bridge on a free transfer in September 2021.

On 28 January 2022, Hewelt joined EFL League Two side Tranmere Rovers on a short-term contract and was immediately loaned back to Bamber Bridge for the rest of the 2021–22 season. On 26 February 2022, his loan at Bamber Bridge was cut short and he instead joined Northern Premier League Premier Division rivals Stafford Rangers on loan for the remainder of the season.

Honours 
Everton U23s

 Premier League Cup: 2018–19

References

External links
 Mateusz Hewelt at Soccerway
 Profile at 90minut.pl

Polish footballers
Living people
Association football goalkeepers
1996 births
Polish expatriate footballers
Expatriate footballers in England
Polish expatriate sportspeople in England
Miedź Legnica players
Everton F.C. players
Tranmere Rovers F.C. players
Bamber Bridge F.C. players
Stafford Rangers F.C. players
I liga players
Northern Premier League players